Daniel Jędraszko (born April 6, 1976 in Szczecin) is a Polish sprint canoeist who has competed since the late 1990s. He has been world champion four times in the Canadian canoe C-2 event with partner Paweł Baraszkiewicz.

They also won a C-2 500 m silver medal at the 2000 Summer Olympics in Sydney. The same year Jędraszko won his only European title to date (again in the C-2 500 m). However at the 2004 Athens games they underperformed and came away without a medal.

Injuries prevented him from competing in 2005 but in 2006 he formed a new C-2 partnership with Roman Rynkiewicz. They finished fifth at the world championships in Szeged, Hungary. At the 2008 Summer Olympics in Beijing, they finished ninth in the C-2 500 m event. Jędraszko has a total of ten medals at the ICF Canoe Sprint World Championships.

Jędraszko is a member of the Posnania Poznań club. He is 192 cm (6'4") tall and weighs 93 kg (205 lb).

For hts sport achievements, he received: 
 Golden Cross of Merit in 2000; 
 Knight's Cross of the Order of Polonia Restituta (5th Class) in 2007.

References

1976 births
Canoeists at the 2000 Summer Olympics
Canoeists at the 2004 Summer Olympics
Canoeists at the 2008 Summer Olympics
Living people
Olympic canoeists of Poland
Olympic silver medalists for Poland
Sportspeople from Szczecin
Polish male canoeists
Olympic medalists in canoeing
ICF Canoe Sprint World Championships medalists in Canadian
Medalists at the 2000 Summer Olympics